Hookworms are intestinal, blood-feeding, parasitic roundworms that cause types of infection known as helminthiases. Hookworm infection is found in many parts of the world, and is common in areas with poor access to adequate water, sanitation, and hygiene. In humans, infections are caused by two main species of roundworm, belonging to the genera Ancylostoma and Necator. In other animals the main parasites are species of Ancylostoma.

Species

The two most common types of hookworm that infect humans are Ancylostoma duodenale and Necator americanus.

Hookworm species that are known to infect domestic cats are Ancylostoma braziliense and Ancylostoma tubaeforme. Wild cats are infected by Ancylostoma pluridentatum.

Dogs are commonly infected by Ancylostoma caninum, but may also be infected by Uncinaria stenocephala and Ancylostoma braziliense.

In Asia, Ancylostoma ceylanicum is endemic among dogs and cats and infects humans.

Cattle are infected by Bunostomum phlebotomum.

At least 68 species have been described in wild mammals.

Characteristics
The two species that commonly infect humans have a similar morphology. A. duodenale worms are pale grey or slightly pink. The head is bent a little in relation to the rest of the body, forming a hook shape – hence the name. The hook is at the front end of the body. They have well-developed mouths with two pairs of teeth. Males measure approximately 10 by 0.5 mm, and females are often longer and stouter. Males also have a prominent copulatory bursa posteriorly.

N. americanus is generally smaller than A. duodenale, with males usually being 5 to 9 mm long and females about 10 mm long. Instead of the two pairs of teeth in A. duodenale, N. americanus has a pair of cutting plates in the buccal capsule. Also, the hook is much more defined in Necator americanus.

Life cycle

The host is infected by the larvae, not by the eggs, and the usual route is through the skin. Hookworm larvae need warm, moist soil, above 18 °C, in order to hatch. They will die if exposed to direct sunlight or if they become dried out. Necator larvae can survive at higher temperatures than Ancylostoma larvae. 

First-stage larvae (L1) are non-infective, and once hatched in the deposited feces, they feed on that, and then feed on soil microorganisms until they moult into second stage larvae (L2). First- and second-stage larvae are in the rhabditiform stage. After feeding for seven days or so they will moult into third-stage larvae (L3) known as the filariform stage, which is the non-feeding, infective stage. Filariform larvae can survive for up to two weeks. They are extremely motile and will move onto higher ground to improve their chances of finding a host.

N. americanus larvae can only infect through penetrating skin, but A. duodenale can also infect orally. A common route of passage for the larvae is the skin of barefoot walkers. Once the larvae have entered the host they travel in the circulatory system to the lungs where they leave the venules and enter the alveoli. They then travel up the trachea and are coughed up, swallowed and end up in the small intestine. In the small intestine, the larvae moult into stage four (L4) the adult worm. It takes from five to nine weeks from penetration to maturity in the intestine.   

Necator americanus can cause a prolonged infection lasting from one to five years with many worms dying in the first year or two. Some worms though have been recorded as living for fifteen years or more. In comparison, Ancyclostoma duodenale worms are short-lived lasting for around six months. However, larvae can remain dormant in tissue stores and be recruited over many years to replace the worms that die.

The worms mate inside the host, in which the females also lay their eggs, to be passed out in the host's feces into the environment to start the cycle again. N. americanus can lay between nine and ten thousand eggs per day, and A. duodenale between twenty-five and thirty thousand per day. The eggs of the two species are indistinguishable.

Worms need five to seven weeks to reach maturity and symptoms of infection can therefore appear before eggs are to be found in the feces, making the diagnosis of hookworm infection difficult.

Diagnosis
Signs and symptoms of hookworm infection vary by host and hookworm species. In humans, the first sign of infection is itching and skin rash. Humans with light infections may show no symptoms, but humans with heavy infections may have abdominal pain, diarrhea, loss of appetite, weight loss, fatigue and anemia. Children's physical and cognitive growth may be affected.

Dogs and cats may experience dermatitis, enteritis, and intestinal blood loss. Dogs may additionally experience anemia, hemorrhagic diarrhea, anorexia and dehydration.

Cattle may experience skin lesions, anemia, and rapid weight loss.

Diagnosis for many forms of hookworm infections is confirmed through fecal analysis to identify hookworm eggs. In animals, fecal floatation is used to detect hookworm eggs.

Treatment
Treatment for hookworm infections depends on the species of hookworm and the species of the infected host. In humans, treatment is by anthelminthic medications, such as albendazole and mebendazole. Treatment in animals can be done with a variety of anthelminthics. A high-protein diet, supplemental iron, or a blood transfusion may also be necessary.and also levamisole ,pyrentel pamoate are used to treating  hookworm anemia and hookworm disease

Prevention
Humans can avoid hookworm infections by avoiding skin-to-soil contact, such as walking barefoot, in areas where hookworms are common. Additionally, infection can be controlled by defecating indoors and not using human feces as a plant fertilizer. Lawns and kennels may be sterilized by sodium borate. Large education efforts funded by John D. Rockefeller helped reduce the rates of infection among children in the American South during the 1910s.

References

Parasitic nematodes of mammals
Ancylostomatidae